Fabio Moro (born 13 July 1975 in Bassano del Grappa, Vicenza) is a retired Italian footballer who played as a defender.

References

1975 births
Living people
Italian footballers
Italy youth international footballers
Ravenna F.C. players
Torino F.C. players
A.C. ChievoVerona players
A.C. Monza players
U.S. Salernitana 1919 players
Parma Calcio 1913 players
Serie A players
Serie B players
Serie C players
Association football defenders
Sportspeople from the Province of Vicenza
Bassano Virtus 55 S.T. players
Footballers from Veneto